Dakotadon (meaning "Dakota tooth") is a genus of iguanodont dinosaur from the Barremian-age Lower Cretaceous Lakota Formation of South Dakota, USA, known from a partial skull. It was first described in 1989 as Iguanodon lakotaensis, by David B. Weishampel and Philip R. Bjork. Its assignment has been controversial. Some researchers suggest that "I." lakotaensis was more basal than I. bernissartensis, and related to Theiophytalia, but David Norman has suggested that it was a synonym of I. bernissartensis. Gregory S. Paul, working on a revision of iguanodont species, gave "I." lakotaensis its own genus (Dakotadon) in 2008.

References

Early Cretaceous dinosaurs of North America
Dinosaurs of North America
Fossil taxa described in 2008
Iguanodonts
Taxa named by Gregory S. Paul
Paleontology in South Dakota
Ornithischian genera